The Sacramento Scorpions was a USISL American soccer team that played in Sacramento, California from 1996 to 1998. During its brief existence, the team received several LA Galaxy players on loan.

Year-by-year

Defunct soccer clubs in California
Soccer clubs in Sacramento, California
USL Second Division teams
1996 establishments in California
Soccer clubs in California
Association football clubs established in 1996
1997 disestablishments in California
Association football clubs disestablished in 1997